Andrew John Arnott (born 18 October 1973) is an English former footballer who played as a midfielder in the Football League, but also occasionally deputised as a forward. He began his career with Gillingham, later joining Manchester United on loan with a view to a permanent move, although he made no appearances. He subsequently played for Leyton Orient, Fulham, Brighton & Hove Albion and Colchester United in the Football League.

Career

Born in Chatham, Arnott began his career at nearby Gillingham, where he signed his first professional contract in May 1991. At the end of the 1991–92 season, after only 32 appearances and 8 goals, Arnott went on loan to Manchester United, specifically to play in the Blue Star youth tournament in Zurich. He started all United's games as they reached the final, scoring two of their six goals, before they lost 1–0 to FC Spartak Moscow. However, he did not join the club and returned to Gillingham for the start of the next season. He concluded his time at Gillingham with a record of 12 goals in 73 league games.

Leyton Orient signed Arnott in January 1996 for a fee fixed by tribunal at £10,000, a further £5,000 after 50 first team appearances and a 25 per cent sell-on clause. He made his debut against Darlington in February 1996 and made 54 League and cup appearances, scoring six goals. He did enough to convince Fulham to pay £23,000 for his services in the summer of 1997, but under Mohamed Al-Fayed's regime at the club Arnott could only manage one substitute appearance. He was loaned out to Rushden & Diamonds in 1998, before transferring to Brighton & Hove Albion for £20,000 in October 1998. He made 28 appearances for Brighton, and was involved in a swap loan deal with Colchester United in September 1999, being exchanged for Warren Aspinall. After making four appearances, the deal was made permanent in November of the same year.

Arnott made 15 league appearances in total while with the club, but was forced to call time on his professional career after undergoing a hernia operation. After leaving Colchester, he signed for Stevenage Borough in December 2000, making his debut for Stevenage on 18 August 2001 against Stalybridge Celtic. Again, he was troubled with injuries during his time, joining Dover Athletic in 2002.  He was made team captain for Dover, and moved to Welling United in 2004 before a final move to Ashford Town (Kent).

Career statistics

A.  The "Other" column constitutes appearances and goals (including those as a substitute) in the Football League Trophy.

References

External links

Profile at Archive Database for Colchester United

1973 births
Living people
Sportspeople from Chatham, Kent
Footballers from Kent
English footballers
Association football midfielders
Gillingham F.C. players
Manchester United F.C. players
Leyton Orient F.C. players
Fulham F.C. players
Rushden & Diamonds F.C. players
Brighton & Hove Albion F.C. players
Colchester United F.C. players
Stevenage F.C. players
Dover Athletic F.C. players
Welling United F.C. players
Ashford United F.C. players
English Football League players
National League (English football) players